Bus Lane ( or May narok muay yok law; lit: "the hell bus, wheelie Chinese girl") is a 2007 Thai action-comedy film directed by Kittikorn Liasirikun.

Plot
The chaos ensues on Songkran day (13 April) when the disappointed security Sap wants to return home to see his little daughter. He got on the bus line 39 (Rangsit–Sanam Luang) with Laa as a driver and Go as a bugging conductor. When he gets off the bus but Laa refuses to follow. With pressure Sap decided to impulsively hijack, where the whole cab is filled with various types of passengers.

Cast
Udom Taephanit as Go
Kiat Kitjaroen as Sap
Suthep Po-ngam as Laa
Naowarat Yuktanan as Pawng
Siriphan Cheenchombun as Tik
Arisara Wongchalee as Plaa
Khomsan Nanthajit as Dawn
Prinya Ngamwongwarn
Anchana Phetjinda as tom boy
Pimchanok Ponlabhun as Muay
Achita Sikamana as Suay
Theeratorn Siriphunvaraporn as Chong
Boriwat Yuto

Filming location
The scene where the bus runs on a scenic rural road with a hilly terrain as well as a sign indicating the route to Nakhon Ratchasima was filmed at Treasure Hill Golf & Country Club in Ban Bueng, Chonburi.

Release and reception
Bus Lane opened in Thailand cinemas on April 12, 2007. It was No. 1 at the box office on opening weekend, knocking the Thai canine comedy Ma-Mha from the top spot, and beating out the Jim Carrey thriller The Number 23, which opened  the same week. It held the No. 1 spot for a second week, before dropping to No. 2 in its third week, No. 3 in its fourth week, and finally No. 10 and No. 16 in the subsequent two weeks.

References

External links 
 

2007 films
Thai-language films
Thai action comedy films
RS Film films
2007 action comedy films
Films about buses
2000s comedy road movies
Films set in Bangkok
Films directed by Kittikorn Liasirikun